"No One Talks" was the first commercial single taken from Grammy award-winning singer, Moya Brennan's album Signature released the same year. This was Moya's first single  available to download from more than one online shop. The B-side to the single, the traditional Gaelic song "Éirigh Suas a Stóirín (Rise Up My Love)" was previously only available on the Germany-only album Óró - A Live Session. The cover shows a photograph by Mella Travers.

The song also appears on Moya Brennan's 2008 live album Heart Strings.

Track listing 
Download
"No One Talks"
"Éirigh Suas a Stóirín"

References

2006 singles